Aleksander Spivakovsky is a Ukrainian academic administrator and mathematician. He is the rector of Kherson State University and a professor and chair of informatics, software engineering, and economic cybernetics. On October 21, 2016, Spivakovsky was elected an academician and corresponding member of the National Academy of Educational Sciences of Ukraine.

References 

Living people
Place of birth missing (living people)
Ukrainian academicians
Academic staff of Kherson State University
Heads of universities and colleges in Ukraine
Cyberneticists
21st-century Ukrainian mathematicians
Year of birth missing (living people)